The 2006-07 Georgia Tech Yellow Jackets tennis team represented the Georgia Tech Yellow Jackets in the college tennis season of 2006-07. This season netted them their third straight ACC Championship, and their win in the NCAA tournament earned Georgia Tech its first-ever NCAA-recognized title.

Roster 
Source:

Schedule

References

External links 
 2006 - 2007 Women's Tennis Schedule
 NCAA Championship In Review

Georgia Tech Yellow Jackets women's tennis